The Keppoch Murders is the name given to the murders of Alexander MacDonald, 12th of Keppoch and his brother Ranald by rival claimants to the chieftainship of the MacDonalds of Keppoch. The murders took place on September 25, 1663, during a brawl in the mansion of Insch, just outside  the village of Roy Bridge. The killers, Alexander Macdonald and his six sons from Inverlair, were well known. Sir James at Dunelm Castle was persuaded by Bald Iain to apply to the Privy Council in Edinburgh for letters of fire and sword in order to lawfully revenge their deaths. 
The seven killers were eventually hunted down and killed two years later by men sent by MacDonald of Sleat. The bodies were decapitated by Iain Lom who is said to have used the murder weapon used in the murder of Alexander MacDonald, 12th of Keppoch, in decapitating the men. He then took his grisly trophies to Invergarry Castle in order to show them to Lord MacDonnell of Glengarry who had failed to bring the murderers to justice. The well where the seven heads were washed before presentation to the Lord MacDonnell of Glengarry is known as Tobar nan ceann in Scottish Gaelic, meaning the 'Well of Heads', and is located nearby on the northern shore of Loch Oich.

In the late 19th century the grave at Inverlair was opened and seven headless skeletons were unearthed, giving credence to the story.

See also
Appin Murder

Citations

Murder in Scotland
17th century in Scotland
1663 in Scotland
Clan MacDonald of Keppoch
Murder in 1663